The 1990 UCF Knights football team was the twelfth season for the team, and UCF football's first season in Division I-AA (now commonly known as 'FCS'). In their first year in the division, Gene McDowell led the Knights to a 10–4 record, a program best, and a trip to the I-AA playoffs. UCF would make it to the semifinals, and became the first school in history to qualify for the I-AA playoffs in its first season of eligibility.

During the 1990s, UCF would compile an overall record of 67–46–0 (.593) during the decade.

Schedule

References

UCF
UCF Knights football seasons
UCF Knights football